Carol Herselle Krinsky (born 1937 Brooklyn, New York) is an American architectural historian.

She graduated from Erasmus Hall High School, studied at Smith College (1957 BA) and New York University, (Ph.D. 1965). Krinsky is a professor of twentieth-century architectural history at New York University and a former President of the Society of Architectural Historians.

Books
 Contemporary Native American Architecture: Cultural Regeneration and Creativity, Oxford University Press, 1996
 Synagogues of Europe: Architecture, History, Meaning, MIT Press, 1985; revised edition, MIT Press, 1986; Dover Publications reprint, 1996
 Europas Synagogen: Architecktur, Geschichte, Bedeutung, Stuttgart, Deutsche Verlags-Anstalt, 1988. 
 Gordon Bunshaft of Skidmore, Owings & Merrill, MIT Press, 1988
 Rockefeller Center, Oxford University Press, 1978
 Di Lucio Vitruvio Pollione 'De architectura.' Libri dece traduti de latino in Vulgare Affigurati: Com[m]entati: & con mirando ordine insigniti: Nachdruck der kommentierten ersten italienischen Ausgabe von Cesare Cesariano, Como, 1521, Munich, Wilhelm Fink Verlag, 1969. Essay. index. 
 co-editor (with Kathryn A. Smith) Studies in Manuscript Illumination: A Tribute to Lucy Freeman Sandler, London/Turnhout, Harvey Miller/Brepols, 2008

Awards 

 1986: National Jewish Book Award in the Visual Arts category for Synagogues of Europe

References

1937 births
Living people
American architectural historians
New York University alumni
Smith College alumni
New York University faculty
Writers from New York City
American women historians
Historians from New York (state)
21st-century American women